Frédéric Fernand Guirma (born 27 April 1931, Ouagadougou) is a diplomat, writer and politician from Burkina Faso. In 1959 he became the president of the trade union centre CATC. From 1960 to 1963 he was the Republic of Upper Volta's first Ambassador to the United States. He was also Permanent Representative to the United Nations. He heads the conservative political party Front de Refus or RDA. He gained 5.87% of the vote in the 1998 presidential election.

Literary works 
Princess of the full moon (African folklore), 1969
Tales of Mogho: African Stories from Upper Volta, 1971

References

Burkinabé writers
Burkinabé politicians
Living people
1931 births
Burkinabé diplomats
Burkinabé trade unionists
Ambassadors of Burkina Faso to the United States
Permanent Representatives of Burkina Faso to the United Nations
People from Ouagadougou
21st-century Burkinabé people